Achiote is a corregimiento in Chagres District, Colón Province, Panama with a population of 771 . Its population as of 1990 was 755; its population as of 2000 was 784.

References

Corregimientos of Colón Province